Bozalan is a village in the Cizre District of Şırnak Province in Turkey. The village is populated by Kurds of the Tayan tribe and had a population of 1,158 in 2021.

The six hamlets of Akarsu, Çağlayan, Hisar, İnci, Soğukpınar and Yukarıkonak are attached to Bozalan.

References 

Villages in Cizre District
Kurdish settlements in Şırnak Province